Dholera is a village in the Mahendergarh district of Haryana, India. The Dholera Sarpanch seat is Unreserved.

Adjacent villages
 
 Nangal Shyalu
 Nangal Pipa
 Nangal Nunia
 Nangal Kalia
 Nangal Dargu
 Nangal Chaudhary
 Nangal Soda
 Nizampur, Mahendragarh

Demographics of 2011
As of 2011 India census, Dholera (Mahendragarh) had a population of 3424 with a total of 665 households. Males (1833) constitute 53.53%  of the population and females (1591) 46.46%. Dholera has an average literacy (2263) rate of 66.09%, which is lower than the national average of 74%: male literacy (1407) is 62.17%, and female literacy (856) is 37.82% of total literates(2263). In Dholera, 10.77% of the population is under 6 years of age (369).

References 

Villages in Mahendragarh district